Guillaume Knecht is a former professional rugby league footballer who played in the 1990s and 2000s.

Playing career
Guillaume Knecht made his début for the Featherstone Rovers on Sunday 3 August 1997.

Note
Guillaume Knecht's forename is occasionally spelled incorrectly as Guilleme.

References

Featherstone Rovers players
Living people
Place of birth missing (living people)
French rugby league players
Rugby league second-rows
Baroudeurs de Pia XIII players
Year of birth missing (living people)